Various newspapers, organisations and individuals endorsed parties or individual candidates for the 2015 United Kingdom general election

Endorsements for parties

Newspapers and magazines

National daily newspapers

National weekly newspapers

National monthly newspapers

National Sunday newspapers

News magazines

Political magazines

English newspapers

Northern Irish newspapers

Scottish newspapers

Individuals

Animal Welfare Party
Piers Morgan, journalist and television personality

Conservative Party
 Michael Bloomberg, American businessman and politician
Sol Campbell, footballer
Bob Dudley, American businessman
Ron Dennis, businessman
Charles Dunstone, businessman
George Iacobescu, businessman
Stuart Rose, businessman
Tidjane Thiam, French-Ivorian businessman and former politician
Paul S. Walsh, businessman
Andrew Lloyd Webber, composer and Conservative member of the House of Lords

Green Party of England and Wales
George Monbiot, writer and environmentalist
Jack Monroe, writer and social activist
Grace Petrie. activist and singer-songwriter
Peter Tatchell, political campaigner and journalist

Labour Party
Duncan Bannatyne, businessman and author
Trevor Beattie, advertising executive
Jo Brand, comedian, writer, actress and former nurse
Russell Brand (in England and Wales, except Brighton), comedian, activist
Michelle Collins, actress
Steve Coogan, actor and comedian
Peter Duncan, actor
Ben Elton, comedian
Martin Freeman, actor
Stephen Fry, comedian, writer, actor and presenter
Stephen Hawking, professor, theoretical physicist, cosmologist, author
Wayne Hemingway, fashion designer and businessman
Mathew Horne, actor
Jason Isaacs, actor
Eddie Izzard, comedian, actor and writer
Owen Jones, author, newspaper columnist and commentator
Kathy Lette, author
David Morrissey, actor, director, producer and screenwriter
Susie Orbach, writer and social critic
Paul O'Grady, broadcaster
 Ronnie O'Sullivan, professional snooker player
Grayson Perry, artist
Will Self, author, journalist, broadcaster
Delia Smith, cook, author and television presenter
Patrick Stewart, actor
Harry Styles, singer of One Direction
David Tennant, actor
Polly Toynbee, journalist, author
Dale Vince, entrepreneur
Robert Webb, comedian

Liberal Democrats
John Cleese, actor and comedian

Scottish National Party
Dennis Canavan, former Scottish Labour Party and independent politician
Martin Compston, former footballer and actor
Brian Cox, actor
Ian McElhinney, actor
Tommy Sheridan, former Scottish Socialist Party and Solidarity member of the Scottish Parliament for Glasgow. Co-leader of Solidarity
Elaine C. Smith, actress and comedian

Trade Unionist and Socialist Coalition
Jawad Ahmad, singer, musician and activist

UK Independence Party
Richard Desmond, publisher, adult industry businessman
Nick Griffin, former leader of the British National Party, former MEP
Tommy Robinson, former leader and founder of the English Defence League, founder of the European Defence League, former Vice-Chairman of British Freedom Party
Paul Sykes, businessman, philanthropist

Organisations

Conservative Party
Young Republicans International Committee, youth wing of US Republican Party

Labour Party
Australian Labor Party, abroad
Socialist Environment and Resources Association, environmental activist group
Union of Construction, Allied Trades and Technicians, trade union
UNISON, trade union
USDAW, trade union

Trade Unionist and Socialist Coalition
National Union of Rail, Maritime and Transport Workers, trade union

UKIP
Britain First, far-right 'street-defence' organisation

Parties
Some parties which only contest elections in certain parts of the United Kingdom have endorsed political parties in areas they don't contest
The Labour Party (Great Britain) endorsed the Social Democratic and Labour Party in Northern Ireland.
Plaid Cymru (Wales) endorsed the Green Party in England and the Scottish National Party in Scotland.
The SNP (Scotland) endorsed the Green Party in England, and Plaid Cymru in Wales.
The DUP and UUP (Northern Ireland) formed a unionist pact in four seats, with DUP candidates standing in Belfast East and Belfast North, and UUP candidates standing in Fermanagh and South Tyrone and Newry and Armagh.
The 3 Green Parties in the United Kingdom, the Green Party of England and Wales, the Scottish Green Party and the Green Party in Northern Ireland, endorsed each other in their respective areas.

Endorsements for individual candidates

Danny Alexander, Liberal Democrat candidate for Inverness, Nairn, Badenoch and Strathspey
Hugh Grant, actor

Ed Balls, Labour Party candidate for Morley and Outwood
PinkNews

Nick Clegg, Liberal Democrat candidate for Sheffield Hallam
The Times

Oliver Coppard, Labour Party candidate for Sheffield Hallam
Owen Jones, Guardian journalist.
Ronnie O'Sullivan, professional snooker player

Andrew Dismore, Labour Party candidate for Hendon
PinkNews

Lynne Featherstone, Liberal Democrat candidate for Hornsey and Wood Green
PinkNews

Mike Freer, Conservative Party candidate for Finchley and Golders Green
PinkNews

Andrew George, Liberal Democrat candidate for St Ives
Brian May, Guitarist of Queen

Naomi Long, Alliance Party candidate for Belfast East
PinkNews

Caroline Lucas, Green candidate for Brighton Pavilion
Julia Chanteray, President of the Brighton & Hove Chamber of Commerce
Tom Burke, environmentalist, former Executive Director of Friends of the Earth
Tony Juniper, activist, writer, environmentalist
Charles Secrett, author, environmentalist broadcaster
 Russell Brand, comedian, activist
David Attenborough, naturalist and broadcaster
Joanna Lumley, actress and author
Thom Yorke, musician and songwriter; member of Radiohead
Brian May, musician, astrophysicist and animal welfare campaigner; member of Queen
Billy Bragg, singer-songwriter
Rory Bremner, impressionist and satirist
Stephen Frears, film director
Katharine Hamnett, fashion designer
Jeremy Irons, actor
Diana Quick, actress
Bianca Jagger, human rights activist
Kevin McCloud, Grand Designs presenter
Alistair McGowan, actor and impressionist
Cornelia Parker, sculptor and installation artist
Tracy Worcester, former actress and animal welfare campaigner
Mark Constantine, founder of Lush cosmetics
Joseph Corré, co-founder, Agent Provocateur
John Ashton, former special representative for climate change at the Foreign Office
Prof. Tim Jackson, sustainable development, University of Surrey
Jane Goodall, primatologist and UN messenger of peace
Satish Kumar, former monk and peace activist
Jeremy Leggett, green energy entrepreneur
Jonathon Porritt, environmentalist and broadcaster
Chris Rapley, former director of the Science Museum and the British Antarctic Survey
Gordon Roddick, founder of 38 Degrees and co-founder, The Big Issue and The Body Shop
Charles Secrett, former head of Friends of the Earth, England, Wales and Northern Ireland
Dale Vince, Ecotricity founder
Sir Tim Smit, co-founder of the Eden Project
George Monbiot, journalist and author
Michael Morpurgo, children's author, poet, playwright
Mark Steel, writer and comedian
Mark Thomas, comedian and journalist
PinkNews

Maajid Nawaz, Liberal Democrat candidate for Hampstead and Kilburn
David Aaronovitch, journalist
Richard Dawkins, scientist and writer

Derek Wall, Green candidate for Windsor
Democratic Union Party, Syrian Kurdish political party

Tom Watson, Labour candidate for West Bromwich East
 Hugh Grant, actor

Hywel Williams, Plaid Cymru candidate for Arfon
Caroline Lucas, Green candidate for Brighton Pavilion

See also
 Newspaper endorsements in the United Kingdom general election, 2010
 United Kingdom general election, 2010 (Endorsements)
 Endorsements in the United Kingdom general election, 2017
 Endorsements in the 2019 United Kingdom general election

References

2015 United Kingdom general election
United Kingdom 2015 endorsements
General election, 2015